The 1976 Arkansas International was a men's tennis tournament played on indoor hardcourts at Burns Park in North Little Rock, Arkansas in the United States that was part of the 1976 USLTA-IPA Indoor Circuit. It was the third edition of the event and was held from March 1 through March 7, 1976. Fourth-seeded Haroon Rahim won the singles title and earned $7,000 first-prize money.

Finals

Singles
 Haroon Rahim defeated   Colin Dibley 6–4, 7–5
 It was Rahim's 2nd and last singles title of the year and of his career.

Doubles
 Syd Ball /  Ray Ruffels defeated  Giuliano Pecci /  Haroon Rahim 6–3, 6–7, 6–3

References

External links
 ITF tournament edition details

Arkansas International
Arkansas International
Arkansas International